Salamander is a 1928 Soviet-German silent biopic film directed by Grigori Roshal and starring Bernhard Goetzke, Natalya Rozenel and Nikolay Khmelyov.

Plot
The film is based on real events and reveals the tragic episodes from the life of the Austrian biologist scientist-materialist Paul Kammerer (1880-1926), hunted by regressive scientists and Catholic reactionaries who committed suicide.

The film is set in Leipzig, Germany, which is ruled by clergy and aristocracy, at a time when fascism is starting to emerge, and the working class is forced to live in poverty. Professor Zange is employed here and he is one of the few who sympathizes with the poor. The scientist uses salamanders for his experiments and learns that their inheritance is dependent on external factors. As he makes this discovery he becomes a menace to the existing political system and the clergy conspires with the aristocracy to get rid of him.

Cast
 Bernhard Goetzke as Professor Zange  
 Natalya Rozenel as Felicia, his wife  
 Nikolay Khmelyov as Prince Ruprecht Karlstein, fascist
 Sergey Komarov as Pater Brzhezinskiy, jesuit
 Vladimir Fogel as baron-reactionist 
 Aleksandr Chistyakov as Prayer, pressman
 Mikhail Doller as Filonov, Zange's assistant
 Elsa Temary as Bertha, Zange's assistant
 Anatoli Lunacharsky

References

Bibliography 
 Christie, Ian & Taylor, Richard. The Film Factory: Russian and Soviet Cinema in Documents 1896-1939. Routledge, 2012.
 Bernhard Götzke in Moskau. In: Wochenbericht der Gesellschaft für kulturelle Verbindung der Sowjetunion mit dem Auslande 4 (1928), Nr. 32, p. 18 (Short article about a reception in honour of Goetzke in Moscow by the Society for Cultural Relations of the Soviet Union with Foreign Countries on the occasion of the completion of the film "Salamander" with speeches by Olga Kameneva, Anatoly Lunacharsky, Grigori Roshal, Aleksej A. Sidorov and Goetzke (in German, with 1 photo)).

External links 
 

1920s biographical drama films
Soviet biographical drama films
German biographical drama films
Biographical films about scientists
Films of the Weimar Republic
Soviet silent feature films
German silent feature films
Films directed by Grigori Roshal
Films set in Leipzig
German black-and-white films
1928 drama films
1928 films
Silent drama films
Soviet black-and-white films
1920s German films